= Nahid Biyarjomandi =

Iranian rugby coach

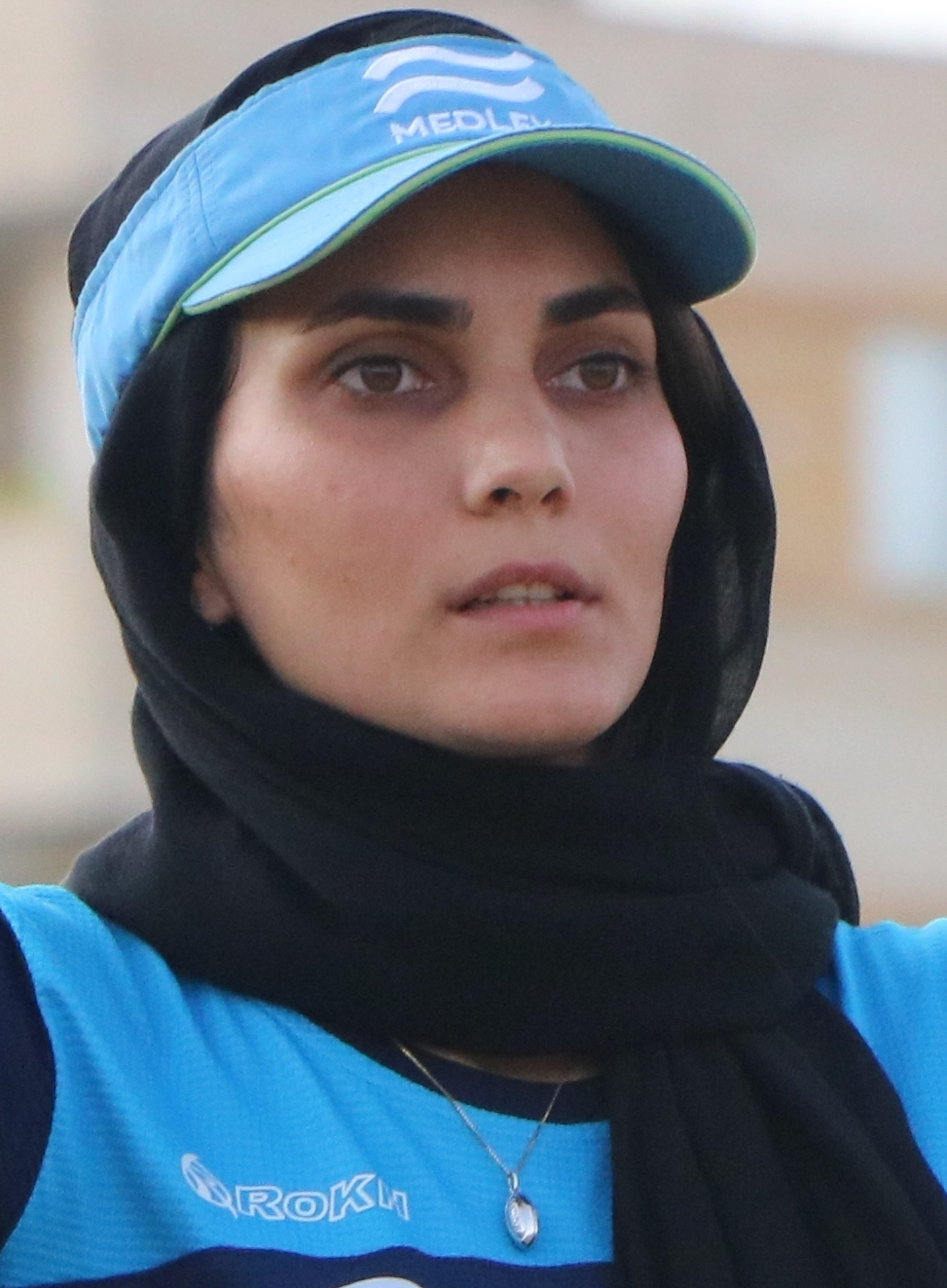
- Nahid Biyarjomandi in 2016.

Personal information
- Born: 12 April 1988 (age 38) Karaj, Iran
- Education: Sport physiology
- Years active: 2006–present
- Height: 165 cm (5 ft 5 in)
- Weight: 57 kg (126 lb)

Sport
- Country: Iran
- Sport: rugby
- College team: Iranian women's national rugby
- Club: fallow deer rugby

Nahid Biyarjomandi (Persian: ناهید بیارجمندی, born April 12, 1988, in Karaj) is an Iranian rugby coach. She was chosen as one of 15 Unstoppable women in rugby. In 2016, she was appointed by the Iran Rugby Federation as head of its development committee, overseeing both women's and men's participation, and currently sits on the union's board.

== Life ==
Nahid Biyarjomandi was born on April 12, 1988, in Karaj.

== work ==
She is coach of the Iranian women's national rugby team. Biyarjomandi founded the first women's rugby club in Iran and her involvement in World Rugby's global ‘Try And Stop Us’ campaign has had a positive impact in her homeland.

She is one of the Asia Rugby Exco members and the chairperson of the Gender Equity committee, and also the board member and Head of Development Committee of Iran Rugby.

== Achievement ==
- 2021 World Rugby Women's Executive Leadership Scholarship recipients
